The Berendei or Berindei (Romanian: Berindei; Ukrainian: Берендеї, Berendeyi; Russian: берендеи, berendei, перендеи, perendei, перендичи; in Hungarian: berendek; in Polish: Berendejowie) were a medieval Turkic tribe, most likely of Kipchak origin. They were part of the tribal confederation of the "peak caps" or the "black hats" (the Chorni Klobuky, in Turkic karakalpak).

Origins
The Berindeis were semi-nomadic and have been documented as holding various military positions, such as that of "frontier guards" on the payroll of Rus' lords. The Berindeis are mentioned in the chronicles of the Kievan Rus' in the 11th and 12th centuries as "Chornye Klobuki" and, together with the Pechenegs and Uzs, became settled along the borders of the Russian steppes. Some rebel Berindei tribes took refuge in territories which are part of today’s Romania. Most of the Berindeis remained on the territories of the Kiev and Pereyaslavl principalities, where they functioned as cavalry troops in the region of the lower Dnieper river.

Assimilation
During the 12th century the Berindeis were assimilated, maintaining however their own military aristocracy. The Berindei nobility were accepted by the elite of the Kievan Rus' state, and towns created by them started to flourish. The Berindei cavalry continued to remain active against the raids undertaken by the Cumans. 
Over the course of the 12th century, the Berendeis became assimilated and their state evolved into a feudal principality with its own military aristocracy. Berendei nobles were accepted by the elite of Kievan Rus' on equal terms. Berendei cities and towns emerged. Rus' princes continued to hire Berendei cavalry to defend against Cumans, and also in their civil wars. In 1177, a Cuman-Kipchak army, allied with Ryazan, sacked six cities belonging to the Berendei and Torkil.

After the great Mongol invasion of 1241, some Berindeis moved to Bulgaria and others joined those who had taken refuge in Hungary. The rest of the tribes mixed with the nomad population of the Golden Horde, after which they cease being mentioned by the Berindei tribe name by the historians of the time.

Placename connections
Some of Turkic placenames in south of Kyiv Oblast and in Cherkasy Oblast, namely Kaharlyk, Karapyshi, Tahancha, Koshmak, are believed to be connected to the Berendei. So is name of the city of Berdychiv in southern part of Zhytomyr Oblast, literally of "Berendychi".

Also there is a village called Berendi in the Serik town of the Antalya province in Turkey, the people of this village are known as settled people "coz"; it is one of the oldest villages in the area. Probably they are the descendants of Muslim Pechenegs coz, since they are not called by the name of the nomad cuz people Oghuz Turks (Yörüks).

There are two villages called Berende in Bulgaria which name according to the linguist Anna Choleva–Dimitrova stems from the tribe of the Berendei.

Berendei names in Romania
On the territory of today’s Romania, the Berindeis are documented in Teleorman County, around the town of Roșiorii de Vede, together with the Pechenegs, Uzs, and Cumans. In Olt County there is a Berindei village. Berindei (occasionally spelled Berindey) as a family name has survived in the name of several noted Romanian personalities, such as the architects Ion. D. Berindey and Dimitrie I. Berindey and the general Anton Berindei, born in Roșiorii de Vede; the architects Ion (Johny) Berindei and Ion Berindei, the historians Dan Berindei and Mihnea Berindei; the jazz musicians Emil Berindey, Mihai Berindei, and Ștefan Berindei. During the communist regime in Romania (1945–1989), many Berindeis have emigrated to Europe and the United States.

References

Turkic peoples of Europe
Extinct Turkic peoples